Konstadinos "Kostas" Koukodimos (born 14 September 1969 in Melbourne) is a retired Greek long jumper and New Democracy politician, currently serving as the mayor of Katerini, Macedonia. He was named the 1991 Greek Male Athlete of the Year. His family has hails from Agios Dimitrios, Pieria.

Koukodimos, who was raised in Pieria, Central Macedonia, is best known for his bronze medal at the 1994 European Championships. His personal best is 8.36 metres, achieved in June 1994 in Khania.

He is also a politician and former member of the Hellenic Parliament, elected for New Democracy in the Pieria constituency in 2007. In January 2008, the journalist Makis Triantafyllopoulos revealed that Koukodimos was calling him and other journalists of the Proto Thema newspaper to cover the Christos Zachopoulos scandal. As a result, Koukodimos was forced to leave New Democracy's parliamentary group and participate in parliament as an independent. He returned to New Democracy's parliamentary team after six months.

He was re-elected to parliament in the elections of 2009, May 2012, June 2012, January 2015 and September 2015.

On 2 June 2019, he was elected mayor of Katerini, defeating the incumbent  with a majority of 54.44% in the second round of voting. He was sworn in on 31 August and his term, like that of all other Greek mayors, officially commenced on 1 September.

International competitions

References

External links
  
 
 
 Short bio

1969 births
Australian people of Greek descent
Living people
Athletes from Melbourne
Sportspeople from Central Macedonia
Greek Macedonians
Greek male long jumpers
Olympic athletes of Greece
Athletes (track and field) at the 1992 Summer Olympics
Athletes (track and field) at the 1996 Summer Olympics
Athletes (track and field) at the 2000 Summer Olympics
World Athletics Championships athletes for Greece
Mediterranean Games gold medalists for Greece
Mediterranean Games silver medalists for Greece
Athletes (track and field) at the 1991 Mediterranean Games
Athletes (track and field) at the 1997 Mediterranean Games
European Athletics Championships medalists
Greek sportsperson-politicians
New Democracy (Greece) politicians
Greek MPs 2007–2009
Greek MPs 2009–2012
Greek MPs 2012 (May)
PAOK athletes
Iraklis athletes
Greek MPs 2012–2014
Greek MPs 2015 (February–August)
Greek MPs 2015–2019
Mediterranean Games medalists in athletics
People from Pieria (regional unit)